Morten Wivestad (born 10 November 1973) is a football agent and retired Norwegian football defender.

He started his career in Ørn-Horten and was drafted into the senior team in 1991. From 1997 to 2002 he played for Lyn, recording 9 games in the 1997 Norwegian Premier League. He did not play any matches during his last two seasons.

After retiring Wivestad became a football agent, among others for Jørgen Skjelvik, Ghayas Zahid, Sander Berge, Håkon Evjen and Filip Delaveris. Also an agent for coaches, Wivestad was the agent when SK Brann signed Rikard Norling in late 2013.

References

1973 births
Living people
Norwegian footballers
People from Horten
FK Ørn-Horten players
Lyn Fotball players
Eliteserien players
Norwegian First Division players
Association football defenders
Association football agents
Sportspeople from Vestfold og Telemark